Rodolfo Piza Rocafort (San José (Costa Rica), 12 August 1958) is a Costa Rican politician and lawyer. He served as executive president of the Costa Rican Social Security Fund during the administration of Miguel Ángel Rodríguez (PUSC), and later served as justice of the Supreme Court of Justice.

He was also one of the notables elected by the government of Laura Chinchilla to issue a report on state reform. Piza was a candidate for the Social Christian Unity Party from the Social-Christian Rebirth faction in the 2013 Social-Christian primary elections, being defeated by rival Rodolfo Hernández who, however, chose Piza as a vice presidential candidate after the convention had passed.

Following the resignation of Hernández as a candidate on 5 October, Piza announced on 11 October that he had accepted to be the PUSC candidate. The appointment took place after an agreement between the Christian Social Rebirth and Calderonist Convergence factions. In the meeting for his choice were the one who was the campaign chief of Hernandez, Humberto Vargas, Carlos Araya Guillén and the candidate for deputy by Cartago, Jorge Rodríguez. In addition, by the executive committee, Gerardo Vargas, the president, and Gerardo Alvarado, Secretary General

His candidacy was registered on 17 October 2013. He was the fifth most voted candidate, winning 6% of the votes.

He ran again for the Presidency of Costa Rica for the 2018 Elections but lost in the first round.

References

1958 births
Living people
People from San José, Costa Rica
20th-century Costa Rican lawyers
Social Christian Unity Party politicians
University of Costa Rica alumni
Complutense University of Madrid alumni
21st-century Costa Rican judges